The Institute of Industrial Arts Technology Education is the professional association for New South Wales (NSW) Industrial Arts educators.

External links 
Institute of Industrial Arts Technology Education

Educational organisations based in Australia